The women's 200 metres event at the 2008 African Championships in Athletics was held at the Addis Ababa Stadium on May 3–4.

Medalists

Results

Heats
Qualification: First 4 of each heat (Q) and the next 4 fastest (q) qualified for the semifinals.

Wind: Heat 1: -3.0 m/s, Heat 2: -1.4 m/s, Heat 3: -2.9 m/s, Heat 4: -1.8 m/s, Heat 5: -1.8 m/s

Semifinals
Qualification: First 2 of each semifinal (Q) and the next 2 fastest (q) qualified for the final.

Wind: Heat 1: -1.7 m/s, Heat 2: -2.9 m/s, Heat 3: -1.6 m/s

Final
Wind: +1.5 m/s

References
Results (Archived)

2008 African Championships in Athletics
200 metres at the African Championships in Athletics
2008 in women's athletics